Anya Linden, Baroness Sainsbury of Preston Candover  (née Eltenton; 3 January 1933) is an English retired ballerina and patron of the arts.

Born in Manchester, she spent her childhood in California, where she received her early training with Koslov in Hollywood. She returned to England in 1947 and studied at the Sadler's Wells Ballet School, joining the company in 1951. She was promoted to soloist 1954 and to ballerina 1958.

She married John Sainsbury, Baron Sainsbury of Preston Candover in 1963 and retired from dancing in 1965. In 1987, she founded the biennial Linbury Prize for Stage Design to identify and encourage talented newcomers to the field of theatre design. Along with her husband, she founded the Linbury Trust, named from a combination of the names Linden and Sainsbury.

The retailer Sainsbury's, formerly led by her husband, developed a potato variety in 1996 that was named 'Anya' in her honour.  She was appointed CBE in the 2003 New Year Honours.

References
 Anya Linden, Ballerina Gallery
 Anya Eltenton, The Peerage
 John Sainsbury's official site
 Dictionary of Dance: Anya Linden
 The Linbury Trust

English ballerinas
1933 births
Living people
Sainsbury of Preston Candover
Commanders of the Order of the British Empire
Dancers of The Royal Ballet
Spouses of life peers
People from Preston Candover